The Club Colombia Masters was a golf tournament co-sanctioned by the European Challenge Tour and the Tour de las Américas and was first played in 2007. The event was held at the Country Club de Bogotá, in Bogotá, Colombia. The tournament was organized by the Corporacion Internacional de Golf, managed by German Calle Jr. and Jorge Muñoz. This was the first golf tournament ever to be sanctioned by the European Challenge Tour in Colombia. In 2010 it was replaced on the schedule by the Copa Antioquia, held in Medellín.

2007
The first tournament was won by Edoardo Molinari from Italy. Molinari, the 2005 U.S. Amateur champion, had turned professional the year before and was trying to get onto a tour when he was invited to play in Bogotá. Molinari and Gustavo Mendoza, a local player, entered a sudden-death play-off which was settled on the second extra hole after their fourth round scores left them tied at the top of the leaderboard on five under par (269). For this first professional win Molinari received €21,690 and the right to play on the European Challenge Tour, the lower tier of the European Tour.

"This is incredible," Molinari smiled. "It was quite a spectacular week. I'm very happy about this victory, because I worked hard for it during the winter. I'm going to enjoy it."

2008
The second Club Colombia Masters was won by Dutchman Wil Besseling in a seven shot victory with a 16 under par total of 268. Besseling picked up the winner’s cheque for €18,303 which moved him from 41st to sixth place on the European Challenge Tour Rankings.

“I started very well and my swing felt good all day,” he said. “I struggled a little yesterday, but today it was really good. I didn’t make any mistakes and it feels great to be the winner. Although I had a lead, I just tried to keep playing one shot at a time,” he added. “The guys made some bogeys behind me and that made the gap even bigger but I just kept playing my own game and it all worked out perfectly. It feels awesome."

2009
The 2009 Colombia Masters was the only tournament of the season co-sanctioned by the European Challenge Tour and the Tour de las Americas. Colombian golfer Camilo Villegas had a 9 hole demonstration on the Tuesday prior to the tournament where he played with his brother Manuel. Large crowds came to the Country Club de Bogota for Villegas only presentation of the year in his home country.

Teenager Alan Wagner from Argentina clinched his maiden Challenge Tour title on the final day when the lead changed hands several times. Wagner eventually emerged triumphant after a round of 68 to close on 13 under par. The 19-year-old received a winner’s cheque for US$24,802 and finished at the top of the Challenge Tour Rankings and one shot in front of his nearest challenger Edoardo Molinari of Italy, the 2007 winner.

Winners

Notes

References

External links 
Official coverage on the Challenge Tour's official site

Golf tournaments in Colombia
Former Challenge Tour events
Tour de las Américas events
Recurring sporting events established in 2007
Recurring sporting events disestablished in 2009
2007 establishments in Colombia
2009 disestablishments in Colombia